The first railway in the Kingdom of Romania opened in 1869 and linked Bucharest and Giurgiu. The first railway on electric current in the current Romanian territory opened in 1854, between Oravița and Baziaș in Banat, right next to the border with Serbia; however, that region was under the administration of the Austrian Empire at the time, and became part of Romania after World War I.

Since then, the Romanian railway network has been significantly expanded, and is now the fourth largest in Europe by total track length, comprising . Romania's railway system is inadequately-connected and one of the least durable railway systems globally.

Romania is a member of the International Union of Railways (UIC). The UIC Country Code for Romania is 53.

Operators

The network used to be operated by Căile Ferate Române, the state railway company, but since 1998, a number of private companies have begun operations in passenger and/or freight transport.
 Regiotrans 
 Grup Feroviar Român 
 Servtrans
 Softrans
 Transferoviar Grup
 Unifertrans
 Astra Trans Carpatic

CFR's rail freight division became CFR Marfă.

Rail links with adjacent countries 

 Same gauge 1435mm:
Hungary – Multiple crossings (from North to South - Carei, Valea lui Mihai, Episcopia Bihor, Salonta, Curtici. Multiple daily passenger frequencies to Budapest and beyond (only to Győr, Mosonmagyaróvár, Hegyeshalom, and Vienna for the moment) from Bucharest and from many cities within Transylvania. Both networks electrified at 25 kV, 50 Hz AC (only electrified crossing at Curtici/Lokoshaza).
 Serbia – crossings at Jimbolia and Stamora Moravița. As of March 2020, no passenger rail transport from Bucharest to Belgrade via Timișoara and Vršac. No electrified crossings.
 Bulgaria – crossings at Calafat, Giurgiu and Negru Vodă. Daily passenger service to Sofia and beyond (Athens and Istanbul) from Bucharest. No voltage issues (currently no electrified crossings, Calafat-Vidin crossing electrification is planned, same voltage, 25 kV, 50 Hz AC.
 Ukraine – Dual gauge crossing at Halmeu. Crossing not electrified. Currently freight only. Dual gauge line enables standard gauge connections with Hungary and Slovakia through Chop.
 Break-of-gauge:
Ukraine – Break-of-gauge /. Crossings at Vicșani, Valea Vișeului and Câmpulung la Tisa (including bogie conversion systems). Dual gauge (4 rail) track exists between Tereseva (Ukraine)/Câmpulung la Tisa – Sighetu Marmației – Valea Vișeului, going back into Ukraine. Ukrainian trains (both freight and passenger services) occasionally use this route without stopping within Romania. International passenger services exists between Bucharest and Kyiv (and onwards to Moscow) via Vicșani (operated by CFR, with UZ and RZD cars) and between Sighetu Marmației and Teresva (operated by UZ). Crossings are not electrified.
 Moldova – Break-of-gauge /. Crossings and bogie changers exist at Ungheni (Moldova) and Galați-Reni. Crossings not electrified, as the Moldovan Railways network has Diesel traction only. Daily passenger service to Chișinău from Bucharest. Multiple daily services from Iași.

References

See also

 Transport in Romania
Căile Ferate Române
Grup Feroviar Roman
Regiotrans
International Railway Systems